13 Scorpii, also known by its Bayer designation c2 Scorpii, is a binary star in the constellation Scorpius.  Its apparent magnitude is 4.57, meaning it can be faintly seen with the naked eye. Based on parallax estimates made by the Hipparcos spacecraft, the system is located about 480 light-years (147 parsecs) away. It is located within the Upper Scorpius subgroup of the Scorpius–Centaurus association.

13 Scorpii is a spectroscopic binary, meaning the two stars are too close to be individually resolved, but periodic Doppler shifts in the star's spectrum indicate there must be orbital motion. In this case, light from only one of its stars can be detected and it is a double-lined spectroscopic binary. The two have an orbital period of 5.7805 days and an eccentricity of 0.19. The primary star, at 11 million years old, is a B-type main-sequence star with a spectral type of B2V.

References

Scorpius (constellation)
B-type main-sequence stars
Scorpii, 13
079404
Scorpii, c2
6028
Spectroscopic binaries
145482
Durchmusterung objects
Upper Scorpius